Dawahares (pronounced DAW-hairs) was an American retail clothing store chain. It was founded by S.F. Dawahare in 1907 in Neon, Kentucky, and remained within the family for four generations. In 1979, the company expanded into the Cincinnati, Ohio market by acquiring the five-store Martin's Town & Country chain.

The chain operated nearly 30 stores in Kentucky, Tennessee, West Virginia, and Ohio. It declared bankruptcy in 2008 and liquidated its 22 remaining stores.

References

Retail companies established in 1907
Retail companies disestablished in 2008
Defunct retail companies of the United States
Defunct companies based in Kentucky